Úpice is a town in Trutnov District in the Hradec Králové Region of the Czech Republic. It has about 5,500 inhabitants.

Administrative parts
The village of Radeč is an administrative part of Úpice.

Geography
It lies in the Giant Mountains Foothills. It is situated on the Úpa river, which gave the town its name.

History
It is proven that Úpice existed already in the 11th century, however the first written mention is from 1358. It was a small town until the second half of the 19th century, when the textile and machinery industries developed.

Until 1918, the Eipel – Úpice town was a part of the Austrian monarchy (Austria side after the compromise of 1867), in the Trautenau – Trutnov District, one of the 94 Bezirkshauptmannschaften in Bohemia.

In 1975, the village of Radeč was joined to Úpice.

Demographics

Economy
The largest employer based in the town is Kasper Kovo, a metal processor.

Sights

The Church of the Saint James the Great was built in 1698–1705, after the old wooden church from the 14th century was burned down in 1625. The altar from 1730 includes image of Saint James the Great painted by Petr Brandl.

Notable people
Josef Čapek (1887–1945), artist and writer; lived here
Karel Čapek (1890–1938), writer; lived there
Richard Sacher (1942–2014), politician

Twin towns – sister cities

Úpice is twinned with:
 Piechowice, Poland

References

External links

Cities and towns in the Czech Republic
Populated places in Trutnov District